The buff-spotted flameback (Chrysocolaptes lucidus) is a species of bird in the family Picidae. It is found on the  Philippine islands of Bohol, Leyte, Samar, Biliran, Panaon, Mindanao, Basilan, and Samal.  It is sometimes considered a subspecies of the greater flameback.

References

Collar, N.J. 2011. Species limits in some Philippine birds including the Greater Flameback Chrysocolaptes lucidus. Forktail number 27: 29–38.

buff-spotted flameback
Endemic birds of the Philippines
Fauna of Bohol
Fauna of Leyte
Fauna of Samar
Fauna of Biliran
Fauna of Mindanao
Fauna of Basilan
buff-spotted flameback